The Journal of Hindu Studies is a triannual peer-reviewed academic journal established in 2008. It is published by Oxford University Press on behalf of the Oxford Centre for Hindu Studies It covers all aspects of Hindu studies.

Of the three annual issues, one is guest-edited and one open for submissions. The third issue usually publishes conference and panel papers. The first two issues are on the same broad annual theme. Themes published to date include: Hermeneutics and Interpretation, Aesthetics and the Arts, and Reason and Rationality.

The disciplines represented in the journal include history, philology, literature and the arts, philosophy, anthropology, sociology, archaeology, and religious studies.

The editors-in-chief are Gavin Flood and Jessica Frazier.

References

External links
 
 Oxford Centre for Hindu Studies

Oxford University Press academic journals
Hindu studies journals
Publications established in 2007
English-language journals
Hindu literature
Triannual journals